Seyed Alireza Ebrahimi (born 9 December 1989) is an Iranian professional footballer who plays as a centre-back and sometimes striker for Persian Gulf Pro League club Persepolis.

Club career

Persepolis 
On 10 August 2021, Ebrahimi signed a two-year contract with Persian Gulf Pro League champions Persepolis.

On October 23, 2021, he was expelled from Persepolis FC after he blasted his coach for his decision to cross him off the active player list.

Honours 

Persepolis
Iranian Super Cup Runner-up (1): 2021

References

External links 
Alireza Ebrahimi  at PersianLeague.com 
Alireza Ebrahimi on instagram  
Alireza Ebrahimi at Soccerway  

1989 births
Living people
Iranian footballers
Association football central defenders
Mes Sarcheshme players
Esteghlal Khuzestan F.C. players
Sanat Mes Kerman F.C. players
Niroye Zamini players
Gol Gohar players
Persian Gulf Pro League players
People from Kerman